Chocolate Chip Cookies is album by Canadian folk rock band Leslie Spit Treeo, released in 1996. It is subtitled "A Rock & Roll Adventure".

The band intended to make "the mother of all concept albums." It contains a cover of Bob Snider's "Ancient Eyes". The band promoted the album by embarking on a full tour of Canada.

Release
A double album, Chocolate Chip Cookies was originally released in a unique paper bag package similar to a cookie bag, with labelling that resembled the design of a Chips Ahoy! bag. Several weeks after the album's release, Nabisco threatened the band with a copyright infringement lawsuit, and in response, the band recalled all unsold copies of the album, held a bonfire in Toronto's High Park to burn the cookie bag packages, and rereleased the album in a conventional jewel case.

Critical reception

The Times Colonist stated: "Those seeking Mellon Collie-type angst in their sprawling, double disc epics will take solace in 'Average Joe's rallying chorus cry of 'Life sucks!' and ballad 'Book of Rejection's assertion that 'self- esteem may be over-rated/You're going nowhere without some hatred." 

AllMusic wrote that "the whole, interspersed with Chipmunks-speed spoken-word snippets that more or less advance (or confuse) the narrative, is worthy of Frank Zappa's wry genius in its combination of self-mockery and pinpoint satire."

Track listing

Disc One 
 Warning
 Overture/Second
 Nebulous
 Bad Omen
 Happily Ever After Again
 Average Joe
 Falling Down Again
 Book of Rejection
 The Single
 Can't Stop
 Talking
 Bus to Nowhere
 Chocolate Chip Cookies
 Too You
 Hell or Heaven
 Bystander
 Mole
 Moth to a Flame
 All Is Not Lost
 Stuck in the Middle of a Song
 Outro/Disappear

Disc Two 

 Oh Canada
 Still Talking
 Roly Poly
 Soup Line
 All on Myself
 Ancient Eyes
 Pirates
 Lonely Only
 How Much Is That Doggie
 It's a Dog's Life
 Warthogs Can Fly
 People
 Moderation
 A Way In
 The Single (Dance Remix)
 So Close Yet So Far
 UFO
 Cathy
 Sheila
 Serendipity
 Hold Strong

References

1996 albums
Leslie Spit Treeo albums